The 2018 Gambia Football Federation Cup was the 50th edition of the Gambian Cup since independence, the knockout football competition of Gambia.

Quarter-finals

Semi-finals

First Legs

Second Legs 

Brikama United won 2-1 on aggregate. 

Armed Forces won 4-1 on aggregate.

Final

See also
2017–18 GFA League First Division

References

Gambia
Cup
Football competitions in the Gambia